The abvolt (abV) is the unit of potential difference in the CGS-EMU system of units.

A potential difference of 1 abV will drive a current of one abampere through a resistance of one abohm.

In most practical applications, the volt and its multiples are preferred. The national standard in the United States  deprecates the use of the abvolt, suggesting the use of volts instead.

The name abvolt was introduced by Kennelly in 1903 as a short name for the long name (absolute) electromagnetic cgs  unit of e.m.f. that was in use since the adoption of the cgs system in 1875. The abvolt was coherent with the CGS-EMU system, in contrast to the volt, the practical unit of e.m.f. that had been adopted too in 1875.

Notes

References 

Units of electrical potential
Centimetre–gram–second system of units